Out of Sight is the ninth studio album by American musician James Brown. The album was released in September 1964, by Smash Records.

Track listing

References

1964 albums
James Brown albums
Albums produced by James Brown
Smash Records albums